The First Deadly Sin is a 1980 American crime thriller film produced by and starring Frank Sinatra. The film features Faye Dunaway, David Dukes, Brenda Vaccaro, James Whitmore, and Martin Gabel in his final role. The film is based on the 1973 novel of the same name written by Lawrence Sanders. The screenplay was written by Mann Rubin.

The film originally was slated to be directed by Roman Polanski, who was dropped by Columbia Pictures after statutory rape charges were brought against him. Director Brian G. Hutton took over the production after Polanski fled to France.

The last of nine films produced by Sinatra, and his final starring role, he plays NYPD Sergeant Edward X. Delaney, a troubled veteran New York City Police Department homicide detective. In a supporting role, Dunaway is Delaney's ailing wife, hospitalized during the entire story with a rare kidney affliction. Bruce Willis makes his film debut as an extra walking past Sinatra in a restaurant (although he is virtually unrecognizable due to a hat that covers his eyes).

The First Deadly Sin was the third production by Sinatra's Artanis production company and was shot on location in New York City. It premiered on October 23, 1980 at Loew's State Theatre in Times Square as part of a benefit for the Cabrini Medical Center, a key location in the film. The musical score was by composer and arranger Gordon Jenkins, who first worked with Sinatra on the 1957 album Where Are You?

Plot
The film opens outside Mount Pleasant Baptist Church on West 81st Street in Manhattan. A man is attacked by another man wielding an ice axe. The attack is intercut with graphic closeups of a woman undergoing surgery. The NYPD arrive to process the scene. The coroner, Dr. Ferguson, shows Sergeant Edward Delaney that the fatal wound on the skull was made with a round object.

Meanwhile, the 20th Precinct receives news that Delaney's wife Barbara is recovering from emergency surgery. The information is relayed to Delaney at the scene, and he rushes to the hospital. Barbara's surgeon, Dr. Bernardi, explains that complications from her kidney stones forced him to remove the organ. Over the course of the film, Barbara's condition worsens, and Delaney harbors deep suspicions that Bernardi is incompetent.

The murder on 81st Street is a kind of solace for Delaney. Much to his colleagues' surprise, he throws himself into the case despite constant admonitions from his friends and supervisors that the NYPD's priorities are elsewhere. One of his early visits is to the Metropolitan Museum of Art, where he consults with Arms and Armor curator Christopher Langley about the type of weapon that could make such a unique wound. The elderly Langley is thrilled to have such a unique problem to solve, and he devotes a great deal of time to research.

The angle of entry and the perfectly spherical nature of the wound eliminate most of the weapons familiar to Langley. He decides the weapon must have been some kind of tool, and he visits a hardware store, where he explicitly asks for the best implement to kill someone. A bemused clerk helps Langley deduce that the weapon was most likely an ice axe.

Delaney has discovered that a similar attack had occurred recently on West 79th Street. After consulting with the perpetually harried Ferguson, he discovers that the wound patterns are nearly identical. As they investigate, they realize that similar attacks have been taking place all over New York City. Langley uses the new information to locate the exact model of ice axe that would cause such injuries. At one sporting goods store, the owner hands over the addresses that he collected from every customer who bought that ice axe. The addresses eventually lead Delaney to the high-rise building of Daniel Blank.

Blank has been seen intermittently throughout the film cleaning up after his murders. As Delaney closes in on him, Blank attempts one more attack, but it does not go as planned. After striking several blows, his victim escapes only to be hit by a passing car. Delaney's investigation of Blank confirms that he is the killer. Delaney realizes that his chances of arresting and obtaining a murder conviction against Blank are slim due to Blank's wealth and high social position in the city. Before going to confront Blank in his luxury apartment, Delaney gets a Luger nine millimeter pistol from a closet in his home. It is a souvenir that Delaney brought home as a soldier returning from World War II.

Delaney finds Blank curled up in a closet in a deeply disturbed state. He confesses to his crimes before composing himself. Blank brags about how respectable and well-connected he is, and he guarantees that he will get away with his crime. He confidently goes to the phone to report Delaney for breaking and entering. Delaney shoots Blank in the head with the Luger pistol as Blank is speaking with the police operator on the telephone. Delaney goes to his office at the police precinct station house and retires from the police department. As he is leaving the station house, the desk sergeant tells him of the discovery of Blank's body and asks him if he wants to respond to the call. Delaney informs the sergeant that he just retired as he walks out of the building. The final scene shows Delaney reading to his wife in the hospital, holding her hand. He cries as she dies.

Cast
 Frank Sinatra as Edward X. Delaney
 Faye Dunaway as Barbara Delaney
 David Dukes as Daniel Blank
 James Whitmore as Dr. Ferguson
 Brenda Vaccaro as Monica Gilbert
 Martin Gabel as Christopher Langley
 Anthony Zerbe as Captain Broughton
 George Coe as Dr. Bernardi
 Joe Spinell as Charles Lipsky
 Jeffrey DeMunn as Sergeant Correlli
 Bruce Willis as Man Entering Diner (uncredited)

Critical reception
Critics Roger Ebert and Leonard Maltin both praised Sinatra's performance as one of his better performances, and daughter Nancy Sinatra commented in her book Sinatra: An American Legend that her father was very excited about this film.

Ending
The film's ending was changed from the novel in which the killer Daniel Blank retreated to a bluff called Devil's Needle in upstate New York where he died of dehydration before Delaney and the state troopers were able to bring him down. Here, a less subtle approach allowed the ending to be more in tune with the rest of the film.

William L. DeAndrea noted that "for [the film's] network TV showing, Sinatra added a spoken voice-over" to the conclusion, "changing the meaning of the final images completely".

Trivia
This was Sinatra's last starring role, as well as the first film appearance for Bruce Willis.

Accolades
 Nominated: Academy of Science Fiction, Fantasy & Horror Films, Best Supporting Actor, Martin Gabel
 Nominated: Edgar Allan Poe Awards, Edgar Award, Best Picture
 Nominated: Golden Raspberry Awards, Worst Actress, Faye Dunaway

References

External links
Roger Ebert's Review
 
 
 
 

1980 films
1980s crime thriller films
1980 independent films
1980s serial killer films
American crime thriller films
American independent films
American serial killer films
Films based on American novels
Films based on crime novels
Films based on works by Lawrence Sanders
Films directed by Brian G. Hutton
Films set in New York City
Films produced by Frank Sinatra
American police detective films
American neo-noir films
Filmways films
1980s English-language films
1980s American films